Yurt-e Zeynal (also Romanized as Yūrt-e Zeynal; also known as Yowrd-e Zeynab) is a village in Nilkuh Rural District in the Central District of Galikash County, Golestan Province, Iran. At the 2006 census, its population was 217, in 54 families.

References 

Populated places in Galikash County